Dr. Chester A. Rowell (Oct. 17, 1844 - May 9, 1912) was an American physician and politician who served as a California state senator and as mayor of Fresno. He was also a regent of the University of California.

Before moving to California, Dr. Rowell was a Union soldier in the Civil War mustered in the 17th Illinois Infantry along with four of his brothers. He took part in several battles between 1861 and 1864, including the Fort Donelson, the Battle of Shiloh and the Siege of Vicksburg.

Dr. Rowell arrived in Fresno in 1874 to practice medicine. In September 1876, he established the Fresno Republican newspaper. It was purchased by and eventually merged into the present-day Fresno Bee.

In 1879 he was elected to the state senate in California as a Republican. The county was heavily Democratic at the time, and Rowell was the first Republican to win an election in Fresno County.

In 1909 he received an overwhelming share of the vote to win the mayoral election.

Rowell commissioned the construction of Fresno's first skyscraper, now known as the Rowell building. It is six stories tall and located in downtown Fresno at the southeast corner of Tulare and Van Ness streets.

In 1914, Fresno commissioned Haig Patigian to create a memorial sculpture. The base of the memorial contains a relief where Rowell is shown seated at a patient's bedside. It can be found in the Fresno County Courthouse park, across the street from the Rowell family home in downtown Fresno.

External links
Join California Dr. Chester Rowell

References

1844 births
1912 deaths
Mayors of Fresno, California
University of California regents
Republican Party California state senators
Physicians from New Hampshire
American newspaper founders
People of New Hampshire in the American Civil War
Union Army soldiers
19th-century American politicians
20th-century American politicians
19th-century American businesspeople